Squaric acid, also called quadratic acid because its four carbon atoms approximately form a square, is a diprotic organic acid with the chemical formula C4O2(OH)2.

The conjugate base of squaric acid is the hydrogensquarate anion ; and the conjugate base of the hydrogensquarate anion is the divalent squarate anion . This is one of the oxocarbon anions, which consist only of carbon and oxygen.

Squaric acid is a reagent for chemical synthesis, used for instance to make photosensitive squaraine dyes and inhibitors of protein tyrosine phosphatases.

Chemical properties
Squaric acid is a white crystalline powder. The onset of thermal decomposition depends on the different thermodynamic conditions such as heating rates.

The structure of squaric acid is not a perfect square, as the carbon–carbon bond lengths are not quite equal. The high acidity with pKa = 1.5 for the first proton and pKa = 3.4 for the second is attributable to resonance stabilization of the anion. Because the negative charges are equally distributed between each oxygen atom, the dianion of squaric acid is completely symmetrical (unlike squaric acid itself) with all C−C bond lengths identical and all C−O bond lengths identical.

Derivatives
Many of the reactions of squaric acid involve the OH groups. The molecule behaves similarly to a strong dicarboxylic acid. It is stronger acid than typical carboxylic acids.
C4O2(OH)2  →  [C4O3(OH)]−  +  H+  pK = 1.5
[C4O3(OH)]−  →  [C4O4]2-  +  H+  pK = 3.5

The OH groups are labile in squaric acid.  It forms a dichloride with thionyl chloride:
C4O2(OH)2 +  2 SOCl2 →  C4O2Cl2  +  2 HCl  +  2 SO2
The chlorides are good leaving groups, reminiscent of acid chlorides. They are displaced by diverse nucleophiles. In this way dithiosquarate can be prepared.

The bis(methylether) is prepared by alkylation with trimethyl orthoformate.

Dibutyl squarate is used for the treatment of warts and for alopecia areata .

Diethyl squarate has been used as an intermediate in the synthesis of perzinfotel.

Squaramides are prepared by displacement of alkoxy or chloride groups from C4O2X2 (X = OR, Cl).

One or both of the oxygen (=O) groups in the squarate anion can be replaced by dicyanomethylene =C(CN)2. The resulting anions, such as 1,2-bis(dicyanomethylene)squarate and 1,3-bis(dicyanomethylene)squarate, retain the aromatic character of squarate and have been called pseudo-oxocarbon anions.

Photolysis of squaric acid in a solid argon matrix at  affords acetylenediol.

Coordination complexes
Squarate dianion behaves similarly to oxalate, forming mono- and polynuclear complexes with hard metal ions.
Cobalt(II) squarate hydrate Co(C4O4)(H2O)2 (yellow, cubic) can be prepared by autoclaving cobalt(II) hydroxide and squaric acid in water at 200 °C. The water is bound to the cobalt atom, and the crystal structure consists of a cubic arrangement of hollow cells, whose walls are either six squarate anions (leaving a 7 Å wide void) or several water molecules (leaving a 5 Å void).

Cobalt(II) squarate dihydroxide Co3(OH)2(C4O4)2·3H2O (brown) is obtained together with the previous compound. It has a columnar structure including channels filled with water molecules; these can be removed and replaced without destroying the crystal structure. The chains are ferromagnetic; they are coupled antiferromagnetically in the hydrated form, ferromagnetically in the anhydrous form.

Copper(II) squarate monomeric and dimeric mixed-ligand complexes were synthesized and characterized. Infrared, electronic and Q-Band EPR spectra as well as magnetic susceptibilities are reported.

The same method yields iron(II) squarate dihydroxide Fe2(OH)2(C4O4) (light brown).

Synthesis 
The original synthesis started with the ethanolysis of perfluorocyclobutene to give 1,2-diethoxy-3,3,4,4-tetrafluoro-1-cyclobutene. Hydrolysis gives the squaric acid.

Although impractical, squarate and related anions such as deltate  and acetylenediolate  are obtainable by reductive coupling of carbon monoxide using organouranium complexes.

See also 
 Cyclobutene, 
 Deltic acid, 
 Croconic acid, 
 Rhodizonic acid, 
 Squaramides, the amides of squaric acids
 Semisquaric acid

References

Organic acids
Diketones
Enediols
Cyclobutenes